is a yonkoma Japanese manga series by Tsuyoshi Ōhashi which was serialized in Manga Club. It won the 1998 Bungeishunjū Manga Award.

References

1996 manga
Comedy anime and manga
Takeshobo manga
Yonkoma
Seinen manga